Giesbertiolus is a genus of scarab beetle belonging to the subfamily Cetoniinae. It contains four species, although the placement of G. linnaei is regarded as tentative.

References

External links 

 

Cetoniinae
Beetles described in 1988
Beetles of Central America